The Carrollton Hornets were a minor league baseball team that represented Carrollton, Georgia in the Georgia–Alabama League from 1946 to 1950.

References
Baseball Reference -Hazlehurst-Baxley

Baseball teams established in 1946
Baseball teams disestablished in 1950
Defunct Georgia-Alabama League teams
Professional baseball teams in Georgia (U.S. state)
1946 establishments in Georgia (U.S. state)
1950 disestablishments in Georgia (U.S. state)
Carroll County, Georgia
Defunct baseball teams in Alabama